Iceberg A-68 was a giant tabular iceberg adrift in the South Atlantic, having calved from Antarctica's Larsen C ice shelf in July 2017. By 16 April 2021, no significant fragments remained.

The calving of  reduced the overall size of the Larsen C shelf by 12 percent.

Historical data shows that many icebergs that break off from the Antarctic Peninsula reach South Georgia and the South Sandwich Islands.

The name  was assigned by the US National Ice Center. It broke into parts with the mother berg dubbed .

History and recent developments 
 was part of Larsen C, a section of the Larsen Ice Shelf. Scientists found the crack beginning to form in November 2016. Scientists assess that  "didn't just break through in one clean shot, [but] it formed a lace-network of cracks first." The resulting iceberg was around 175 km long and 50 km wide, 5,800 km² in area, 200 m thick and weighed an estimated one trillion tonnes.

Satellite images from the ESA and EU's Copernicus Program show that as the iceberg moved, it was gradually shrinking and splintering, forming more icebergs in the process.

Post November 2017, satellite images showed that  was slowly drifting northward, with a widening gap to the main shelf.

A British expedition on  intended to sample the marine life at the  cleavage line in March 2018, but had to turn back due to thick sea ice. During 2018,  continued to drift northwards. In 2018 or 2019, a large chunk almost  broke off and was named , with the mother iceberg now being .

On 6 February 2020,  began moving into open waters. On 23 April 2020, a chunk measuring about   broke off the iceberg and was named .

On 4 November 2020, it was reported that  was approaching South Georgia Island and that there was a strong possibility that the iceberg might run aground on the shallower continental shelf near the island, posing a grave threat to local penguins and seals. A spokesman from the British Antarctic Survey stated that the iceberg could become stuck for a number of years, causing disruption to wildlife and the local fishing industry.

The RAF conducted reconnaissance flights over the iceberg on 18 November and 5 December 2020.

, a part of the iceberg was just  from South Georgia, but the concern seemed to have lessened. National Geographic reported that "[s]cientists expect the iceberg ... to either anchor in the shallow waters around the island or move past it in the coming days." On this date it was also reported that a corner had been knocked off , most likely due to impact with the seabed. The new free floating iceberg has been designated .

On 22 December 2020, images from ESA's Sentinel-1 radar satellite showed that  had experienced a major break-up. A modeling study demonstrated that this break-up was likely triggered when part of A-68A became positioned within stronger ocean currents than the rest of the berg, generating enough tension along its body to break it into pieces.

On 28 January 2021, Sentinel-1 discovered that the southern third of  had broken away. The imagery shows these two bergs around 135 km south-east of South Georgia drifting close together.

On 16 April 2021, the largest fragment was down to 3 nautical miles in length and the U.S. National Ice Center, which names, tracks, and documents Antarctic icebergs, discontinued tracking, as the Center only studies icebergs that are at least 20 sq. nautical miles, or that measure 10 nautical miles on the longest axis.

Gallery

References

External links
 
 
 

A-68
Geography of Antarctica